The list of Olympic men's ice hockey players for Australia consists of 15 skaters and 2 goaltenders. Men's ice hockey tournaments have been staged at the Olympic Games since 1920 (it was introduced at the 1920 Summer Olympics, and was permanently added to the Winter Olympic Games in 1924). Australia has participated in one tournament, the 1960 Winter Olympics, where they finished last of the nine nations competing. 

David Cunningham scored the most goals (4) and had the most points (6), while Russell Jones had the most assists (3).

Key

Goaltenders

Skaters

See also
 Australia men's national ice hockey team

Notes

References
 
 
 
 

Australia men's national ice hockey team
Ice hockey
Australia
Australia